St. Anthony's Church, Saint Anthony's Chapel, St. Anthony's Roman Catholic Church, St. Anthony's Catholic Church, St. Anthony Church or variations may refer to:

Albania 
 St. Anthony Church, Laç

Brazil 
 St. Anthony Cathedral, Juiz de Fora

Canada 
St. Anthony of Padua (Ottawa), Ontario

China 
 St. Anthony's Church, Macau, in the Historic Centre of Macau
 St. Anthony's Catholic Church (Shenzhen)

India 
 St. Antony's Church, Chemmanvilai, Kanyakumari, Tamil Nadu
 St. Antony's Church of Urapakkam, Kancheepuram, Tamil Nadu
 St. Antony's Shrine, Puliampatti, Palayamkottai Diocese, Tamil Nadu
 St. Antony's Shrine, Uvari, Tirunelveli District, Tutucorin Diocese, Tamilnadu
 St. Antony's Shrine, Palavakkam, Kancheepuram District, Chengalpet Diocese, Tamilnadu
 St. Antony's Shrine, Kaloor, Kochi, Kerala
 St. Antony's Church, Pazhoor, wayanad, Kerala
 St. Antony's Church, Sundampatti, Krishnagiri, Tamil Nadu

Israel 
 St. Anthony's Church, Tel Aviv

Italy 
 Basilica of Saint Anthony of Padua

Kosovo
Saint Anthony's Church (Gjakova)

Portugal 
 Santo António Church (Lisbon)

Singapore 
 Church of St. Anthony, Singapore, a Catholic church in Woodlands

Sri Lanka 
 St. Anthony's church, Wahakotte
 St. Antony's shrine, Kachchatheevu

Turkey 
 St. Anthony of Padua Cathedral (Istanbul), Turkey

United Kingdom 
St Anthony's Church, Cartmel Fell, Cumbria, England
 St Anthony's Chapel, a ruin in Holyrood Park, Edinburgh, Scotland

United States 
 Saint Anthony's Church (Casa Grande, Arizona)
 Saint Anthony's Catholic Church (Ratcliff, Arkansas)
 St. Anthony's Roman Catholic Church (Sterling, Colorado)
 St. Anthony's Roman Catholic Church (Wilmington, Delaware)
 Saint Anthony Catholic Church (Honolulu), Hawaii
 Saint Anthony Catholic Church in Kailua, Hawaii
 Saint Anthony Catholic Church in Laupahoehoe, Hawaii
 Saint Anthony of Padua Catholic Church in Wailuku, Hawaii
 St. Anthony's Catholic Church (Davenport, Iowa)
 St. Anthony's Catholic Church (Des Moines, Iowa)
 St. Anthony of Padua Church (New Bedford, Massachusetts)
 St. Anthony's Church and School (Cedar Rapids, Nebraska)
 St. Anthony's Church (Bronx)
 St. Anthony of Padua Church (Bronx)
 St. Anthony of Padua Church (Manhattan)
 St. Anthony's Church (Pine Plains, New York)
 St. Anthony's Catholic Church (Padua, Ohio)
 St. Anthony's Catholic Church (Okmulgee, Oklahoma)
 Saint Anthony's Chapel (Pittsburgh), Pennsylvania
 Saint Anthony Cathedral Basilica in Beaumont, Texas
 Saint Anthony's Catholic Church (Bryan, Texas)
 Old St. Anthony's Catholic Church (Violet, Texas)
 Church of Saint Anthony (Casper, Wyoming)

See also
 St Anthony of Padua (disambiguation)
 St. Anthony's Chapel (disambiguation)
 St. Anthony's School (disambiguation)
 St. Anthony's Hospital (disambiguation)